is a Japanese wisteria festival that takes place during April and May.  Places it is celebrated include Tokyo, Shizuoka, and Okazaki.

Fuji Matsuri is a major event every spring at the Kameido Tenjin Shrine in the Koto Ward of Tokyo.

References

Festivals in Tokyo
Festivals in Aichi Prefecture
Spring (season) events in Japan